Caribou Mountain is a  mountain summit located in Bonneville County, Idaho, United States.

Description
Caribou Mountain is the highest peak in the Caribou Range which is a subset of the Rocky Mountains. The remote mountain is set 40 miles southeast of Idaho Falls, Idaho, in the Caribou–Targhee National Forest, and can be seen to the east of Grays Lake National Wildlife Refuge. Precipitation runoff from the mountain's slopes drains into tributaries of the Snake River watershed. This landform's toponym has been officially adopted by the United States Board on Geographic Names.

Climate
Based on the Köppen climate classification, Caribou Mountain has an alpine subarctic climate with long, cold, snowy winters, and mild to warm summers. Winter temperatures can drop below 0 °F with wind chill factors below −20 °F.

See also
 List of mountain peaks of Idaho

References

External links
 Caribou Mountain: Idaho: A Climbing Guide
 National Geodetic Survey Data Sheet
 Caribou Mountain: weather forecast

Mountains of Idaho
Landforms of Bonneville County, Idaho
North American 2000 m summits
Caribou-Targhee National Forest